Beeny, also spelt Beeney, is a surname. Notable people with the surname include:

Aaron Beeney (born 1984), English darts player
Bill Beeny (1926–2022), American Baptist minister 
Christopher Beeny (1941–2020), British actor and dancer
Sarah Beeny (born 1972), British broadcaster and entrepreneur